Daud bin Yusof is a Malaysian politician who has served as Member of the Sabah State Legislative Assembly (MLA) for Bongawan since May 2018. He served as the State Assistant Minister of Agriculture and Food Industries of Sabah in the Heritage Party (WARISAN) state administration under former Chief Minister Shafie Apdal and former Minister Junz Wong Hong Jun from May 2018 to the collapse of the WARISAN state administration in September 2020. He is a member of WARISAN.

Election results

Honours
  :
  Companion of the Order of Kinabalu (ASDK) (2018)

References

Year of birth missing (living people)
Living people
Government ministers of Malaysia
Sabah Heritage Party politicians
Members of the Sabah State Legislative Assembly